Hasta (plural: hastae) is a Latin word meaning "spear". Hastae were carried by early Roman legionaries, in particular they were carried by and gave their name to those Roman soldiers known as hastati. However, during republican times, the hastati were re-armed with pila and gladii and the hasta was only retained by the triarii.

Unlike the pilum, verutum and lancea, the hasta was not thrown, but used for thrusting.

Description

Symbolic usage
A little spear with which a bride's hair was parted into locks.

A spear, as a gymnastic weapon.

Types of Hasta and their usage in the Roman army

Hasta pura

The hasta pura was a spear used in the Roman army as a military decoration for a soldier that distinguished themselves in battle.

Hasta Caelibaris 
The name Hasta Caelibaris means celibate spear. The spear was used during weddings to dress the bride's hair to remind people that the first marriage was attended with war and fighting. The Hasta Caelibaris was equivalent to a hairpin.

Hasta Pampina 
The Hasta Pampina was a type of Hasta called the Thyrus of Bacchus. This was because the point of the spear was buried in vine leaves.

Hasta Prapilata 
The Hasta Prapilata was a spear with its point either covered by a ball or muffled. This type of spear was used by soldiers during training.

Hastarium
Hastae were also used as signs that would be conventionally understood in Roman culture as announcing an auction. Hence, an auction was called a hasta and an auction-room a hastarium.

Hasta Publica 
A Hasta Publica was a spear used to convey that a public auction was taking place.

Hasta Graminea 
The Hasta Graminea was a spear made of an Indian reed that was used in statues of Minerva.

Post-Roman era
The loanwords of Latin word hasta still exists in some languages used in regions that were previously part of the Roman Empire. For example, it is used French with the spelling haste and, and Italian and Spanish with the spelling asta. Other languages also used a modified form or meaning such as Albanian (heshtë, "spear").

See also
 Roman military personal equipment

Notes

Ancient Roman legionary equipment
Military awards and decorations of ancient Rome
Roman spears